The Piano Concerto No. 1 in A minor, Op. 9 by Dmitry Kabalevsky was written in 1928. Its first performance was given with the composer himself as pianist in Moscow on December 11, 1931. The concerto consists of three movements:

I. Moderato quasi andantino
II. Moderato - Allegro assai
III. Vivace marcato

The influence of fellow Russian composers such as Rachmaninov, Shostakovich and especially Prokofiev can be heard throughout the work.

References 

Concertos by Dmitry Kabalevsky
Kabalevsky
1928 compositions
Compositions in A minor